Buffalo is a city in Scott County, Iowa, United States. The population was 1,176 at the 2020 census. Buffalo is located on the Mississippi River. The city is a part of the Quad Cities Metropolitan Area.

History 
Steamship captain Benjamin W. Clarke settled the area which is now Buffalo in 1833. This area was claimed following the 1833 Black Hawk Purchase which opened the area to nonnative settlers. In 1836, Clarke sold a 2/3 interest in 90 acres of land to Captain E.A. Mix and Dr. Pillsbury and collectively the three men platted the town of Buffalo after Buffalo, New York. This was the first town to be platted in Scott County. The town was hopeful for a county seat but found itself on the Western edge of Scott County after its districting in 1837. This made the town unsuitable for the county seat compared to the centrally located Davenport. 

The Buffalo County Public School District #1 opened in the town in 1836. Coal deposits were discovered in 1834 and sold to passing steamboats. A post office was opened in the town in 1836. The first criminal trial in Scott County was held in Buffalo in 1836 for petty theft.

Geography
Buffalo's longitude and latitude coordinatesin decimal form are 41.459231, -90.721244.

This is the only place where the Mississippi River runs chiefly from east to west instead of south or southwesterly.

Demographics

2010 census
As of the census of 2010, there were 1,270 people, 499 households, and 336 families living in the city. The racial makeup of the city was 97.2% White, 0.5% African American, 0.1% Native American, 0.2% Asian, 0.3% from other races, and 1.7% from two or more races. Hispanic or Latino of any race were 2.5% of the population.

There were 499 households, of which 34.7% had children under the age of 18 living with them, 51.7% were married couples living together, 10.2% had a female householder with no husband present, 5.4% had a male householder with no wife present, and 32.7% were non-families. 26.3% of all households were made up of individuals, and 12.2% had someone living alone who was 65 years of age or older. The average household size was 2.55 and the average family size was 3.09.

The median age in the city was 37.9 years. 25.5% of residents were under the age of 18; 7.2% were between the ages of 18 and 24; 28.4% were from 25 to 44; 25.7% were from 45 to 64; and 13.1% were 65 years of age or older. The gender makeup of the city was 50.9% male and 49.1% female.

2000 census
As of the census of 2000, there were 1,321 people, 489 households, and 356 families living in the city. The racial makeup of the city was 95.91% White, 1.29% African American, 0.53% Native American, 0.15% Asian, 0.91% from other races, and 1.21% from two or more races. Hispanic or Latino of any race were 3.86% of the population.

There were 489 households, out of which 33.7% had children under the age of 18 living with them, 60.5% were married couples living together, 8.4% had a female householder with no husband present, and 27.0% were non-families. 23.5% of all households were made up of individuals, and 11.0% had someone living alone who was 65 years of age or older. The average household size was 2.70 and the average family size was 3.16.

27.3% were under the age of 18, 8.0% from 18 to 24, 29.5% from 25 to 44, 22.6% from 45 to 64, and 12.5% were 65 years of age or older. The median age was 35 years. For every 100 females, there were 103.9 males. For every 100 females age 18 and over, there were 96.7 males.

The median income for a household in the city was $44,250, and the median income for a family was $49,808. Males had a median income of $37,100 versus $21,188 for females. The per capita income for the city was $21,957. About 4.4% of families and 5.9% of the population were below the poverty line, including 3.8% of those under age 18 and 8.6% of those age 65 or over.

Education
Davenport Community School District serves Buffalo. Zoned schools include Buffalo Elementary School, Walcott Intermediate School, and Davenport West High School.

Notable person

Colby Lopez, a professional wrestler currently signed to WWE under the ring name Seth Rollins, was raised in Buffalo.

See also

Buffalo High School, listed on the National Register of Historic Places in Scott County, Iowa

References

External links

Cities in Iowa
Iowa populated places on the Mississippi River
Cities in Scott County, Iowa
Cities in the Quad Cities